The 2022 Soul Train Music Awards took place on November 26, 2022, recognizing the best in soul, R&B and Hip-Hop music. The ceremony aired on BET, BET Her, Vh1 and MTV2, with comedian and writer Deon Cole hosting the ceremony. On October 20, 2022, BET announced the nominees, Mary J. Blige and Beyoncé lead with seven nominations each; followed by Ari Lennox with six; and Lizzo and Chris Brown each having received five nominations.

Special Awards
Honorees are as listed below:

Legend Award
Morris Day & the Time

Lady of Soul Award
Xscape

Winners and nominees 
Nominees are listed.

References

External links
 Official website

Soul
Soul Train Music Awards
Soul
Soul